The Wandering Jew is an 1844 novel by the French writer Eugène Sue.

Plot
The story is entitled The Wandering Jew, but the figure of the Wandering Jew himself plays a minimal role.  The prologue of the text describes two figures who cry out to each other across the Bering Straits.  One is the Wandering Jew, the other his sister, Hérodiade.  The Wandering Jew also represents the cholera epidemic— wherever he goes, cholera follows in his wake.

The Wandering Jew and Hérodiade are condemned to wander the earth until the entire Rennepont family has disappeared from the earth.  The connection is that the descendants of the sister are also the descendants of Marius de Rennepont, Huguenots persecuted under Louis XIV by the Jesuits. The brother and sister are compelled to protect this very family from all harm.  After this first introduction, the two appear only very rarely.

The Rennepont family is unaware that these protective éminences grises exist, but they benefit from their protection in various ways, be it by being saved from scalping by the Native Americans, or from languishing in prison.

The Rennepont family lost its position and most of its wealth during the French persecution of the Protestants (after the Revocation of the Edict of Nantes in 1685). A small fortune was given to a Jewish banker immediately before the Renneponts dispersed all over Europe and Asia, and this fortune has grown into a huge sum, through the miracle of compound interest.  In 1682, the Rennepont family members each got a bronze medal telling them to meet back in Paris 150 years later, at which time the fortune will be divided among the surviving members.  So much time has passed, however, that almost none of the still-living Renneponts have any idea why they need to come to Paris. They nevertheless set out from India, Siberia, America, France, and elsewhere to make their way to rue Saint-François No. 3 in Paris by 13 February 1832.

The members of the family are not only dispersed all over the world, but also all over the social ladder, as laborers, factory owners, princes (in India!) and the independently wealthy.

The Jesuits have heard of this huge fortune and want to get it for themselves. Two Jesuits (Rodin and Père d'Aigrigny) and their many recruited accomplices are in charge of obtaining the money for the Society of Jesus and dispossessing the Rennepont family. Their plan is to have only the unwitting Gabriel, the Jesuit missionary, show up to claim the fortune. Since he is a monk and can have no possessions of his own, the fortune will go to the wily Jesuits. Gabriel's entry into the order is not accidental – it is his pious mother, manipulated by the Jesuits, who persuaded him to become a Jesuit.

The Jesuits have spies and henchmen all over the world, from the remote Americas to Siberia, and they use them to put obstacles in the paths of the Renneponts as they make their way back to Paris. Moreover, they also spy on each other, demonstrating that they don't even trust each other.

The principal obstacles are as follows:
Gabriel Rennepont, a Jesuit missionary in America, encounters no obstacles because he is supposed to collect the fortune.
Dagobert, friend of the Rennepont family and guardian of the orphans Rose and Blanche (see below).  Has his papers and the medal stolen by Morok, an animal tamer and accomplice of the Jesuits. Also has his horse, Jovial, killed by Morok's panther. Forced to travel on foot without papers and arrested for vagrancy. Freed by Hérodiade. Lured to a false meeting with a notary pretending to have messages from Général Simon (see below).
Rose and Blanche, twin Rennepont orphans coming from Siberia.  Since they are under Dagobert's protection, they are also arrested and put in jail for vagrancy. Also, they are put in a convent by Dagobert's wife while Dagobert is at the notary meeting.  She is made to swear by the Jesuits that she will not tell Dagobert where they are.
 Général Simon, father of Rose and Blanche, is a Rennepont, unknown to his daughters. Général Simon has been so long exiled from France and his family that he doesn't even know he has daughters.  He thinks he has one son.  He does not arrive for the meeting, either, although his situation is less clear than that of the others.  
Djalma, Indian prince Rennepont, coming from the Far East. In Java, Djalma is accused of belonging to a murderous sect called the “Etrangleurs,” who closely resemble the Thuggee. One of the Jesuit henchmen tattoos Djalma with the Etrangleur tattoo on the inside of his arm while he is asleep. Djalma tries to prove that he is not an Etrangleur, but because of the tattoo is thrown in jail. This causes him to miss the boat to Paris.  After finally arriving in Paris, he is poisoned by Farighea (whom he had thought was his friend), so that he goes into a prolonged sleep. The Jesuits then kidnap him.
Jacques Rennepont, Parisian workman.  He was given papers by his father that explain his fortune, but since he doesn't know how to read or write, he is unable to use them. The Jesuits send a money lender to him; when he cannot repay the loan, he is thrown into debtors' prison.
François Hardy, progressive factory owner, Paris. He is betrayed by his best friend who, under the influence of Père d'Aigrigny, lures Hardy to central France, ensuring that he will not arrive on 13 February.
Adrienne de Cardoville, independently wealthy, Paris. Lives with her aunt, who is a former mistress of father d'Aigrigny.  The aunt, the abbot Aigrigny, and a Jesuit doctor Baleinier connive to put Adrienne in an insane asylum that happens to be next to the convent where Rose and Blanche are trapped.

Only Gabriel shows up to the meeting, but at the last minute Hérodiade makes an appearance.  Gabriel recognizes her from when she rescued him in the Americas.  Hérodiade goes to a drawer and pulls out a codicil that explains that the parties have three and a half months from 13 February to present themselves.  Upon this unexpected turn of events the Père d'Aigrigny is fired, and Rodin replaces him.  He decides to take more drastic action by using cholera to annihilate some of the Rennepont family.  He maneuvers Rose, Blanche, and Jacques in front of the cholera epidemic and thereby rids himself of them.

With François Hardy, Rodin shows him how Hardy's best friend had betrayed him.  He also arranges for Hardy's mistress to leave for the Americas, and has Hardy's treasured factory burn to the ground (all this on the same day). Hardy takes refuge among the Jesuits, who persuade him to enter their order.

Djalma falls in love with Adrienne, so the Jesuits use his passion to destroy him: they make Djalma think that Adrienne has been unfaithful, and he poisons himself.  But he dies slowly and drinks only half the bottle, so there's plenty of time for Adrienne to find out what he's done and poison herself, too. ( c.f. Romeo and Juliet).

On the day of the second meeting, none of the Renneponts show up (Gabriel having quit the Jesuits), and Rodin alone presents himself. But Samuel, the guardian of the house, has realized the injustices that have taken place. He brings the coffins of all the Renneponts back to show Rodin his wickedness, and he burns the testament that would have given Rodin access to the money.

Gabriel and Hardy die as a matter of course, which means that the Wandering Jew and Hérodiade can finally rest in peace. The last pages of the novel recount their final "death," which they joyfully encounter. It is not clear what finally happens to the vast fortune that was never claimed.

Publication
The Wandering Jew was a serially published novel, which attained great popularity in Paris, and beyond. According to historian John McGreevy, the novel was intensely and deliberately "anti-Catholic". Its publication, and that of its predecessor The Mysteries of Paris, greatly increased the circulation of the magazines in which they were published; in addition they are held to have influenced legislation on the Jesuits, and caused a general "jesuitophobie". Antonio Bresciani's L'Ebreo di Verona (The Jew of Verona, 1850) was intended as an answer to Sue's The Wandering Jew. The novel is over 1,400 pages long. An opera, Le Juif errant, by Fromental Halévy, was based on elements of the novel.

Notes

References
Sue, Eugène.  Le Juif Errant.  1844.  Lyon: Éditions Cosmopolis, 1947.

External links

 Wandering Jew and Jewess dramatic screenplays by Robert Douglas Manning 
 The Wandering Jew in English at Project Gutenberg

1844 French novels
Anti-Catholic publications
Society of Jesus
Huguenots
Novels by Eugène Sue
Novels first published in serial form
Wandering Jew
Works originally published in Le Constitutionnel
French novels adapted into plays